Alessio Staelens (born 30 July 1994) is a Belgian footballer who plays as a midfielder for the Belgian club Deinze.

Club career
On 23 May 2013 he replaced Michael Uchebo in the promotion/relegation game between Cercle Brugge and Royal Mouscron-Péruwelz after 86 minutes. Cercle lost the game by two goals of John Jairo Ruiz, but in spite of this result for Cercle this meant they remained in the Belgian Pro League because of their large point advantage.

Family
Alessio Staelens is son of the former international footballer and current Cercle Brugge coach Lorenzo Staelens. Alessio's brother-in-law is Daan van Gijseghem who also plays in Belgian First Division (currently with RAEC Mons).

References

External links
 
 

1994 births
Living people
Association football midfielders
Belgian footballers
Cercle Brugge K.S.V. players
K.M.S.K. Deinze players
Belgian Pro League players
Flemish sportspeople